Phytohaemagglutinin (PHA, or phytohemagglutinin) is a lectin found in plants, especially certain legumes. PHA actually consists of two closely related proteins, called leucoagglutinin (PHA-L) and PHA-E. These proteins cause blood cells to clump together. PHA-E cause erythrocytes (red blood cells) to clump. PHA-L causes leukocytes (white blood cells) to clump. Phytohaemagglutinin has carbohydrate-binding specificity for a complex oligosaccharide containing
galactose, N-acetylglucosamine, and mannose.

It is found in the highest concentrations in uncooked red kidney beans and white kidney beans (also known as cannellini), and it is also found in lower quantities in many other types of green beans and other common beans (Phaseolus vulgaris), as well as broad beans (Vicia faba) such as fava beans. It has a number of physiological effects and is used in medical research. In high doses, it is a toxin.

The lectin has a number of effects on cell metabolism; it induces mitosis, and affects the cell membrane in regard to transport and permeability to proteins. It agglutinates most mammalian red blood cell types.

As a toxin, it can cause poisoning in monogastric animals, such as humans, through the consumption of raw or improperly prepared legumes, e.g., beans. Measured in haemagglutinating units (hau), a raw red kidney bean may contain up to 70,000 hau, but this is reduced to between 200 and 400 hau when properly cooked. A pressure cooker at 15 psi may be used to cook beans in 45 minutes without presoaking. Insufficient cooking, such as in a slow cooker at 75 °C/ 167 °F, may not completely destroy the toxins.

Beans also contain alpha amylase inhibitor, but not in sufficient quantities to affect the digestion of starch after consumption of beans.

Poisoning can be induced from as few as four raw beans. Symptoms usually begin with extreme nausea and vomiting within one to three hours of ingestion, followed by diarrhea. Abdominal pain has been reported in some people. Recovery is usually spontaneous and rapid, occurring within three to four hours after onset of symptoms, although some cases have required hospitalization.

In medicine these proteins are useful and are used as a mitogen to trigger T-lymphocyte cell division and to activate latent HIV-1 from human peripheral lymphocytes. In neuroscience, anterograde tracing is a research method that uses the protein product phytohaemagglutinin PHA-L as a molecular tracer that can be taken up by the cell and transported across the synapse into the next cell thereby tracing the path of axonal projections and relative connections that nerve impulses travel beginning with the source located at the perikaryon (cell body or soma) and through the presynaptic part located on neuron's efferent axon all the way to the point of termination at the efferent synapse which then provides input to another neuron.

Lymphocytes cultured with phytohaemagglutinin can be used for karyotype analysis. Stimulation of peripheral blood lymphocytes by phytohaemagglutinin presents a classic model of transition of cells from the quiescent G0 phase of the cell cycle into G1-, and subsequently progression through S-, G2- and M- phases of the cycle.

History 
Prior to 1960, crude extracts of PHA were known to coat the surface of red blood cells, make them heavier, and thereby improve the separation of the white cell buffy coat.  Peter Nowell, an immunologist and pathologist at the University of Pennsylvania in Philadelphia, was using PHA for this purpose in 1960 when he discovered it also had the ability to stimulate mitotic division of lymphocytes from normal peripheral blood.  Prior to his discovery, these cells were assumed to be the terminal end-products of differentiation.  This work had tremendous implications for the constitutional study of chromosomal disorders.  T. C. Hsu's 1979 book "Human and Mammalian Cytogenetics an Historical Perspective" (ISBN 978-1-4612-6159-9) is an excellent resource for this history.

References

External links 
 

Proteins
Lectins
Foodborne illnesses
Legume lectins